The 2015 Poznań Open was a professional tennis tournament played on clay courts. It was the twelfth edition of the tournament which was part of the 2015 ATP Challenger Tour. It took place at the Park Tenisowy Olimpia in Poznań, Poland from 11 to 19 July 2015, including the qualifying competition in the first two days. The tournament had its prize money increased to €64,000 + Hospitality, and thus offered 100 ATP ranking points for singles and doubles winners.

Singles main-draw entrants

Seeds

Other entrants
The following players received wildcards into the singles main draw:
  Victor Vlad Cornea
  Andriej Kapaś
  Hubert Hurkacz
  Michał Dembek

The following players received entry as a special exempt:
  Pere Riba

The following players received entry from the qualifying draw:
  Maxim Dubarenco
  Rogério Dutra Silva
  Axel Michon
  Artem Smirnov

The following player received entry as an lucky loser into the singles main draw:
  Michal Konečný

Withdrawals
Before the tournament
  Pedro Sousa →replaced by  Franko Škugor
  Alexander Zverev →replaced by  Grzegorz Panfil
  Aslan Karatsev →replaced by  Jan Šátral

During the tournament
  Paul-Henri Mathieu

Doubles main-draw entrants

Seeds

Other entrants
The following pairs received wildcards into the doubles main draw:
  Victor Vlad Cornea /  Karol Drzewiecki
  Michał Dembek /  Viktor Kostin
  Hubert Hurkacz /  Jan Zieliński

The following pair received entry from the qualifying draw:
  Michal Konečný /  Petr Michnev

Champions

Singles

  Pablo Carreño Busta def.  Radu Albot, 6–4, 6–4

Doubles

  Michail Elgin /  Mateusz Kowalczyk def.  Julio Peralta /  Matt Seeberger, 3–6, 6–3, [10–6]

Notes

References

External links
Official Website
ATP Challenger Tour

Poznań Open
Poznań Open
Poz